Jessica Vega Pederson is a Democratic politician in the U.S. state of Oregon. She served in the Oregon House of Representatives, for two two-year terms, from January 2013 through 2016. From 2017 to 2022, Vega Pederson served as a county commissioner for Multnomah County, the state's most populous county. In 2022, Vega Pederson was elected to serve as county chair, and took office in 2023.

Early life and education
Vega Pederson was born in Crown Point, Indiana, a small town near Chicago, and raised in a Mexican-American family. Vega Pederson graduated from Loyola University Chicago, where she majored in informational systems management and technology.

Career
Prior to running for political office, Vega Pederson was a project manager for a tech company. Her listing within the Voter's Pamphlet read: "I am not a politician. I'm a mom and a professional. My husband has his own small business. We work hard and we want a better future for our kids." She and her husband have two small children and live in East Portland.

In November 2013, she was elected to the Oregon House of Representatives, for District 47, for a two-year term starting in January 2013. She was re-elected two years later.

In September 2015, Vega Pederson announced that she would not seek re-election to the House, and would instead run for election to the Multnomah County Commission, for a seat that was due to become open as a result of term limits requiring its then-holder Judy Shiprack to leave the seat. She won election to the commission in the May 2016 primary, representing county District 3, for a four-year term to begin in January 2017. She was sworn in on January 3, 2017. On May 19, 2020, Jessica Vega Pederson was re-elected to a four-year term on the Multnomah County Board of Commissioners. On November 8, 2022, Vega Pederson was elected Multnomah County Chair, defeating fellow commissioners Lori Stegmann (in the primary) and Sharon Meieran (in the general election), for a four-year term to begin in January 2023.

References

External links
 Website at Multnomah County
 Project VoteSmart biography

1975 births
Living people
21st-century American politicians
21st-century American women politicians
American politicians of Mexican descent
Hispanic and Latino American state legislators in Oregon
Hispanic and Latino American women in politics
Loyola University Chicago alumni
Democratic Party members of the Oregon House of Representatives
Multnomah County Commissioners
Politicians from Chicago
People from Crown Point, Indiana
Politicians from Portland, Oregon
Women state legislators in Oregon